Galeria Casas Riegner is a commercial art gallery in Bogotá, Colombia. The gallery is dedicated to represent and promote contemporary Colombian artists  internationally. Founded and directed by Catalina Casas, the gallery is regularly participating in international Art Fairs such as Art Basel, Art Basel Miami Beach, Frieze Art Fair and Frieze Art Fair New York.

Galeria Casas Riegner was established in Miami in 2001. In 2004, the gallery relocated from Miami to Bogotá in order to focus its work on the promotion and dissemination of contemporary art within Colombia and abroad. In March 2005 the new gallery opened its doors in Bogotá.

Featured artists

Johanna Calle
Leyla Cárdenas
María Fernanda Cardoso
Antonio Caro
Fernando Botero
Tony Cruz
Mateo López
Rosario López
Bernardo Ortiz
María Fernanda Plata
Liliana Porter
Alex Rodríguez
Miguel Ángel Rojas
Luis Roldán
Liliana Sánchez
Rosemberg Sandoval
Gabriel Sierra
Wilger Sotelo
José Antonio Suárez Londoño
Angélica Teuta
Icaro Zorbar

References

Art museums and galleries in Colombia